Pakistan Kidney and Liver Institute and Research Center is a tertiary referral hospital in Lahore, Punjab, Pakistan.

Services 
 Nephrology and Renal Transplantation
 Gastroenterology / Hepatology
 Kidney Transplantation and Urology
 Hepatobiliary and Liver Transplantation
 Stone Treatment (Lithotripsy)
 Infectious Diseases
 Endocrinology
 Pulmonology
 General Surgery
 Inguinal Hernia (mesh repair)
 Incisional Hernia
 Para Umbilical Hernia
 Umbilical Hernia
 Open Appendectomy
 Laparoscopic Appendectomy
 Hemorrhoidectomy
 Diagnostic Laparoscopy
 Exploratory Laparotomy
 Laparoscopic Chole
 Open Chole
 Hydrocoele
 Varicocele

References 

Hospitals in Lahore
Kidney organizations
2017 establishments in Pakistan
Hospitals established in 2017